Desire of Damnation is a double CD by the Italian gothic metal band, Theatres des Vampires. The first disc is a live album and contains all the tracks from the DVD The Addiction Tour 2006. Disc two features four new songs as well as five remixed songs.

Track listing

Personnel 
Sonya Scarlet - vocals
Fabian Varesi - keyboards
Gabriel Valerio - drums
Zimon Lijoi - bass
Robert Cufaro - guitars on live tracks
Stephan Benfante - guitars on new tracks

References

Theatres des Vampires albums
2007 compilation albums
2007 live albums